The Mitsubishi J8M Shūsui (Japanese: 三菱 J8M 秋水, literally "Autumn Water", used as a poetic term meaning "Sharp Sword" deriving from the swishing sound of a sword) was a Japanese World War II rocket-powered interceptor aircraft closely based on the German Messerschmitt Me 163 Komet.
Built as a joint project for both the Navy and the Army Air Services, it was designated J8M (Navy) and Ki-200 (Army).

Design and development
The J8M1 was intended to be a licence-built copy of the Messerschmitt Me 163 Komet. Difficulties in shipping an example to Japan meant that the aircraft eventually had to be reverse-engineered from a flight operations manual and other limited documentation. A single prototype was tested before the end of World War II.

The Japanese were aware of the results of the strategic bombing of Germany, and knew that the B-29 Superfortress would be bombing Japan and the resultant problems which would arise from trying to combat this. Japanese military attachés had become aware of the Komet during a visit to the Bad Zwischenahn airfield of Erprobungskommando 16, the Luftwaffe evaluation squadron charged with service test of the revolutionary rocket-propelled interceptor. They negotiated the rights to licence-produce the aircraft and its Walter HWK 509A rocket engine. The engine licence alone cost the Japanese 20 million Reichsmarks (equivalent to  million  euros).

The agreement was for Germany to provide the following by spring 1944:
 Complete blueprints of the Me 163B Komet and the HWK 509A engine.
 One complete Komet; two sets of sub-assemblies and components.
 Three complete HWK 509A engines.
 Inform Japan of any improvements and developments of the Komet.
 Allow the Japanese to study the manufacturing processes for both the Komet and the engine.
 Allow the Japanese to study Luftwaffe operational procedures for the Komet.

The broken-down aircraft and engine were sent to Kobe, Japan in early 1944. It is probable that the airframe was on the Japanese submarine RO-501 (ex-), which left Kiel, Germany on 30 March 1944 and was sunk in the mid-Atlantic on 13 May 1944 by the hunter-killer group based on the escort carrier . Plans and engines were on the Japanese submarine I-29, which left Lorient, France on 16 April 1944 and arrived in Singapore on 14 July 1944, later sunk by the submarine  on 26 July 1944, near the Philippines, after leaving Singapore.

The Japanese decided to attempt to copy the Me 163 using a basic instructional manual on the Komet in the hands of naval mission member Commander Eiichi Iwaya who had travelled to Singapore in the I-29 and flown on to Japan when the submarine docked.

From its inception, the project was a joint Imperial Japanese Army Air Service (JAAF)/Imperial Japanese Navy Air Service (JNAF) venture. The JAAF wanted a new design to be drawn up. The JNAF, on the other hand, felt the design should mimic the German Komet because it had already proven to be a stable aerodynamic body. It was the JNAF which won and issued the 19-shi specification in July 1944 for the design of the rocket-powered defence fighter. The contract went to Mitsubishi Jukogyo KK, which would produce both the JNAF version the J8M1 Shūsui and the JAAF version Ki-200.

The project was headed by Mijiro Takahashi. The JAAF, however decided to undertake their own design to meet the 19-shi specifications, working at their Rikugun Kokugijitsu Kenkyujo (JAAF Aerotechnical Institute) in secret.

At the 1st Naval Air Technical Arsenal in Yokosuka, in association with Mitsubishi and Yokosuka Arsenal, work began to adapt the Walter HWK 509A engine to Japanese manufacturing capabilities and techniques. This was also where efforts were underway to produce a glider version of the J8M to provide handling data. While working on this glider, the MXY8 Akigusa (秋草, "Autumn Grass"), Mitsubishi completed a mock-up of the J8M1 in September 1944.

Both the JAAF and JNAF approved its design and construction and a prototype was built. In December 1944, the MXY8 was completed and, on 8 December 1944, at the Hyakurigahara Airfield, Lieutenant-Commander Toyohiko Inuzuka took the controls of the MXY8. Once in the air, Inuzuka found the MXY8 almost perfectly emulated the handling characteristics of the Komet. Two additional MXY8 gliders were constructed in the naval yard at Yokosuka, one being delivered to the Rikugun Kokugijitsu Kenkyujo (JAAF Aerotechnical Institute) at Tachikawa for evaluation. The JNAF initiated the construction of another prototype, production designation Ku-13. This was to use water ballast to simulate the weight of an operational J8M complete with engine and weapons. This variant was to be built by Maeda Aircraft Institute, while the JAAF version was to be constructed by Yokoi Koku KK (Yoki Aircraft Co). The JNAF also proposed a more advanced trainer, designated the MXY9 Shūka (秋火, "Autumn Fire") which would be powered by a  thrust Tsu-11 ducted-fan engine. The war, however, ended before this model could be built.

Mitsubishi and partners Nissan and Fuji proceeded with development of the airframe and Yokosuka Arsenal was adapting the engine for Japanese production, designated the Ro.2. The Japanese succeeded in producing prototypes that outwardly looked very much similar to the Komet. The J8M1 had a wet weight that was  lighter, the aircraft having a plywood main spar and wooden vertical tail. The designers had also dispensed with the armoured glass in the cockpit and the aircraft carried less ammunition and slightly less fuel.

The Ki-200 and the J8M1 differed only in minor items, but the most obvious difference was the JAAF's Ki-200 was armed with two 30 mm (1.18 in) Type 5 cannon (with a rate of fire of 450 rounds per minute and a muzzle velocity of ), while the J8M1 was armed with two 30 mm (1.18 in) Ho-105 cannon (rate of fire 400 rounds per minute, muzzle velocity .
The Toko Ro.2 (KR10) rocket motor did not offer the same thrust rating as the original, and Mitsubishi calculated that the lighter weight of the J8M1 would not offset this. Performance would not be as good as that of the Komet, but was still substantial.

The engine used the German propellants of T-Stoff oxidizer and C-Stoff fuel (hydrogen peroxide/methanol-hydrazine), known in Japan as Ko and Otsu respectively.

A total of 60 of the training version (Ku-13, Ki-13, MXY-8, MXY-9) were produced by Yokosuka, Yokoi and Maeda. Seven of the operational version (J8M1/Ki-200) were built by Mitsubishi.

Operational history

	

On 8 January 1945, one of the two J8M1 prototypes was towed aloft, water ballast added in place of the fuel tank and rocket engine to test its aerodynamics. The test flights confirmed the design. Training courses for JAAF and JNAF pilots began on the Ku-53 glider, which shared a similar configuration to the J8M1. The 312th Naval Air Group was selected to operate the first J8M1. Mitsubishi, Fuji Hikoki, and Nissan Jidosha all had tooling for mass production well into the advanced stages, ready to produce both the J8M1 and the J8M2 variant, which differed from the J8M1 in sacrificing one of the Type 5 cannon for a small increase in fuel capacity. The first J8M1 prototype to be equipped with the Toko Ro.2 (KR10) was ready in June 1945. They were then transferred from the Nagoya plant to Yokoku for final checks before powered flight testing, after final glide tests with the engine installed.

The J8M took to the air for its first powered flight on 7 July 1945, with Lieutenant Commander Toyohiko Inuzuka at the controls; after his "sharp start" rocket-powered takeoff, Inuzuka successfully jettisoned the dolly upon becoming airborne and began to gain speed, climbing skywards at a 45° angle. Inuzuka managed to glide the aircraft back, but clipped a small building at the edge of the airfield while trying to land, causing the aircraft to burst into flames. Inuzuka died the next day. While Mitsubishi and naval technicians sought to find the cause of the accident, all future flights were grounded. The engine cutout had occurred because the angle of climb, coupled with the fuel tanks being half-filled for this first flight, caused a shifting of the fuel, which in turn caused an auto cutout device to activate because of an air lock in the fuel line. Requests to continue flight testing were denied pending the modification of the fuel pumps in the aircraft. The sixth and seventh prototypes were to be fitted with the modified Ro.2 engine.

Full-scale production readiness was almost at hand, and component construction was already underway. Flight testing was to resume, despite another explosion of the fuel mixture during a ground test days after the crash, in late August 1945 and the J8M2 design was finalized. But on 15 August 1945, the war ended for the Japanese and all work on the J8M ceased. The end of the war also spelled the end of the JAAF's Ki-202 Shūsui-Kai (Modified Shusui), whose design had begun in secret months before. The Ki-202 was to offer improved flight endurance over the Ki-200 and was slated to be the priority fighter for the JAAF in 1946, but no metal was cut before Japan's surrender.

Germany tried to send another Komet in U-864, but the submarine was sunk near Bergen by British submarine  in February 1945.

As with many other Japanese fighter types combating air raids over Japan, the Ki-200 was considered for use in ramming attacks against B-29s. The envisioned mission profile was to make one or two firing passes and then, with the remaining energy, conduct a ramming attack. Any fuel left on board would most likely detonate, increasing the effectiveness of the attack, but also meaning the pilot had little chance of survival. Nevertheless, the cost was deemed to be worth it and plans were being drawn up to form a "Hagakure-Tai" (Special Attack Unit), similar to the German Sonderkommando Elbe, when the war ended.

Variants
Ki-200An interceptor variant for the IJAAS, almost identical to the IJNAS J8M
J8M1
J8M2 Shūsui Model 21(?)
Long-range version for Navy, identical to J8M1, but armament reduced to a single 30 mm (1.18 in) cannon.
J8M3 Shūsui Model 22 (Rikugun Ki-202 Shūsui-kai)
Long-range version for Army and Navy, with fuselage and wingspan lengthened to 7.10 m (23 ft 3 in) and 9.75 m (32 ft 0 in) respectively. Powered by 19.6 kN (4,410 lbf) Tokuro-3, projected maximum speed 900 km/h (560 mph).
Yokosuka MXY-8 "Akigusa" (Yokoi Ku-13)
Training glider using J8M airframe for Navy and Army.
Yokosuka MXY-9 "Shuka"
Training version using J8M airframe, powered by Tsu-11 thermojet engine.

Operators

 Imperial Japanese Army Air Service
 Imperial Japanese Navy Air Service

Survivors
In November 1945, two aircraft were taken from Yokosuka to the United States for evaluation aboard USS Barnes. FE-300/T2-300 (USA ident) (Japanese ident 403) is now exhibited at the Planes of Fame Museum in Chino, California.

The other was at NAS Glenview in October 1946 (identity unknown), but was scrapped.

In the 1960s, a nearly complete (but badly damaged) fuselage was discovered in a cave in Japan. This was on display at a Japanese Air Self Defense Force base near Gifu until 1999, when it was restored and completed by Mitsubishi for display in the company's internal Komaki Plant Museum.

Gallery

Comparative Specifications

See also

Notes

Bibliography
 Butler, Phil. War Prizes: An Illustrated Survey of German, Italian and Japanese Aircraft Brought to Allied Countries During and After the Second World War. Leicestershire, UK: Midland, 1994. .
 Dyer, Edward M. III. Japanese Secret Projects: Experimental Aircraft of the IJA and IJN 1939-1945. Hinckley, UK: Midland Publishing, 2009. .
 Ethell, Jeffrey L. Komet: The Messerschmitt 163. London: Ian Allan, 1978. . (This book shows U-852 or U-68 being used to carry the Me 163.)
 Francillon, Ph.D., René J. Japanese Aircraft of the Pacific War. London: Putnam & Company, 1970 (2nd edition 1979). .
 Green, William. Rocket Fighter (Ballantine's Illustrated History of World War II, Weapons Book No. 20). New York: Ballantine Books, Inc., 1971. .
 Green, William. War Planes of the Second World War: Fighters, Volume Three. London: Macdonald, 1961. .
 Yamashita, Takeo (ed). 秋水」と日本陸海軍ジェット、ロケット機. Tokyo: Model Art Co., 1998.

External links

 JNAF pics.1
 JNAF pics.2
 U-boat forum

J8M, Mitsubishi
J8M
Rocket-powered aircraft
Tailless aircraft
J8M, Mitsubishi
Germany–Japan relations